Tage Juhl Weirum (born 16 February 1949) is a Danish wrestler. He competed in the men's Greco-Roman 68 kg at the 1972 Summer Olympics. The ninth at the World Championships in 1977. Fifth at the European Championships in 1970. He won five medals at the Nordic Championships in 1970-1978.

References

External links
 

1949 births
Living people
Danish male sport wrestlers
Olympic wrestlers of Denmark
Wrestlers at the 1972 Summer Olympics
People from Frederiksværk
Sportspeople from the Capital Region of Denmark